Frank P. Fox (10 June 1877 Monroeville, Pennsylvania – 19 April 1931 Indianapolis, Indiana) was an American racecar driver. After his driving career ended he turned to horse racing. The Fox Stake harness race is named after him. He is buried at Crown Hill Cemetery in Indianapolis.

Indy 500 results

External links

References

1877 births
1931 deaths
Indianapolis 500 drivers
People from Monroeville, Pennsylvania
Racing drivers from Pennsylvania
Racing drivers from Pittsburgh
Burials at Crown Hill Cemetery